Aleksa Matić may refer to:
 Aleksa Matić (footballer, born 1996)
 Aleksa Matić (footballer, born 2002)